Christopher W Burdick is an American politician and attorney, currently serving as a member of the New York State Assembly, representing the 93rd district. In the 2020 New York State Assembly elections, Burdick was elected to succeed David Buchwald. The 93rd Assembly District includes the towns of Bedford, Harrison, Lewisboro, Mount Kisco, New Castle, North Castle, North Salem, Pound Ridge and White Plains. Before joining the New York State Assembly, Burdick served as Town Supervisor for the Town of Bedford.

Education and early career 
Burdick graduated from the University of California at Berkley, where he received a B.A. in economics and history. He later obtained a master's degree in international studies from the Johns Hopkins School of Advanced International Studies. Finally, Burdick earned a Juris Doctor from Seton Hall Law School, in Newark, New Jersey.

Before being elected as Bedford Town Supervisor, Burdick held a senior counsel position at Stewart Title Insurance Company of New York.

Political career 
Burdick's personal political career first started in 1977 when he ran as a Democratic candidate for New Jersey's 40th State Assembly District, at age 26. Burdick gained the most votes in the Democratic Primary but lost to Republican Party candidates William Cary Edwards and Walter M. D. Kern, Jr in the General election. Burdick had previously been a legislative aid to New Jersey State Assemblymember Andrew Maguire.

Burdick was first elected to public office in 2007, when he won a seat on the Bedford Town Board, running as a Democrat. Burdick was re-elected to his position on the town board in 2011. In 2013, Burdick was elected as the Bedford Town Supervisor.

In 2020, Democratic incumbent Assemblyman David Buchwald announced he would not seek re-election for the 93rd Assembly District, to pursue a bid for the New York's 17th congressional district. Burdick won the Democratic primary for the 93rd Assembly race, and went on to win in the General election, defeating Republican candidate John Nuculovic.

Burdick took office as a member of the New York State Assembly on January 1, 2021, leaving his position as Bedford Town Supervisor to Bedford Town Board Member and Deputy Supervisor MaryAnn Carr.

In 2022, Burdick faced a challenge from Gary Lipson, a local attorney based out of White Plains, but won reelection with more than 63 per cent of the vote. Burdick's campaign focused on protecting abortion rights in New York State and environmental policy.

Burdick is a member of the New York State Assembly committees on Correction, Environmental Conservation, Housing, People with Disabilities, and Veterans' Affairs. Burdick is also Chair of the New York State Assembly Subcommittee on Employment Opportunities from People with Disabilities.

Personal life 
Along with his political offices, Burdick has served as Vice President of the East of Hudson Watershed Corporation, an environmental and development corporation, founded by local leaders in Northern Westchester, Putnam, and Dutchess Counties. Burdick also served as Vice Chairman of the Northern Westchester Watershed Committee, an organ within the Westchester County government.

Burdick has lived in Bedford since he moved from New Jersey in 1992. He lives with his wife, Illyria, and has three children and a granddaughter.

Electoral history

References

1951 births
Living people
Democratic Party members of the New York State Assembly
American lawyers
UC Berkeley College of Letters and Science alumni
Seton Hall University School of Law alumni
Paul H. Nitze School of Advanced International Studies alumni
Working Families Party politicians